The Pershing Center (originally known as Pershing Auditorium) is a 4,526-seat multi-purpose arena in Lincoln, Nebraska. Although still physically in place, it is no longer in use.

History
On February 12, 1900, Lincoln's first municipal auditorium, though owned by Lancaster County and operated by the local chapter of the American Legion, opened. The building was burnt to the ground in an accident on April 15, 1928.

By 1931, the city of Lincoln was planning to build a new auditorium and name it after General John J. Pershing, based on votes from students that would ultimately form and attend Lincoln Northeast High School. In 1939, city of Lincoln voters approved a $750,000 bond to build a new auditorium. A second bond in 1950, at cost of $1.5 million, was approved, but an additional $75,000 bond was rejected in 1952. Plans for Pershing were approved in 1955 and the building opened two years later.

Mural
Pershing's exterior was highlighted by a large ceramic tile mural, designed by artists Leonard Thiessen and Bill J. Hammon. Measuring 38-by-140 foot (5320 sq. ft.; 494.2 m2) and consisting of 763,000 1-sq.-inch pieces, it was the largest ceramic tile mural in the United States at the time of its construction.

Sports
The arena was home to the Lincoln Capitols NIFL indoor football team, the Lincoln Thunder ABA basketball team, and the No Coast Derby Girls Women's Flat Track Derby Association league. In 2013, it was home to the Lincoln Haymakers of the Champions Professional Indoor Football League.

Pershing was also a host site for the NSAA boys and girls state basketball, as well as the NSAA girls volleyball championships. It has hosted the national roller-skating championships 28 times, beginning in 1962 though the final 2014 meet, called Last Lap at Pershing.

Concerts and other events
Pershing has held many events in the past, including concerts and WWE/TNA house show wrestling events. The Doors played their first concert since the death of their singer Jim Morrison at Pershing on November 12, 1971. The Grateful Dead's performance, on February 26, 1973, was recorded and makes up half of their live album, entitled Dick's Picks Volume 28. The exterior and marquee of the arena are also featured in the 1981 film, This is Elvis, as it hosted one of Elvis Presley's final concerts in 1977. Phish played the arena in 1995.

Replacement
In 2008–2009, discussions began to build a new, larger arena for Lincoln due to mid-sized arenas no longer able to meet the demands of most tours. According to Pershing General Manager Tom Lorenz "the music and entertainment industry has pulled back on midlevel tours, reducing the number of shows likely to come to Pershing. Normally, Pershing has six to eight concerts annually, but this year will have three or four". A subsidy to cover a budget shortfall of $150,000 was passed by the Lincoln City Council because the situation was so dire, only "10 months into the fiscal year." The larger arena in Lincoln's Haymarket District was ultimately built between 2011 and 2013, opening as Pinnacle Bank Arena opened in August 2013.

The final major event, a concert by Goo Goo Dolls, was held at the Pershing Center August 6, 2014. The last usage of the building was a roller derby match August 23, 2014, between the No Coast Derby Girls and the Kansas City Roller Warriors; it was won by the Kansas City Roller Warriors.

Attempts at reuse and demolition

An RfP was sent out by the City of Lincoln in 2014 looking for reuse plans for the Pershing Center, but none of the proposals were acceptable due to cost. Demolition loomed in the building's future if an alternate use was not found. The contents of the Pershing Center were auctioned off in January–February 2015.

By 2018, the auditorium's future was still unclear. It remained standing and was used only as a storage facility for Pinnacle Bank Arena. Many proposals were floated by private groups and government agencies, but none that the city government (who did not at the time plan to demolish the building) found acceptable.

In June 2020, it was announced that the Pershing Center would be demolished, and would be replaced with an apartment complex and a new library. The building is slated for demolition in 2022. 

Members of the community also voiced their desire to save the large, iconic mural on the auditorium's exterior. Estimates placed preservation and re-installation of the mural elsewhere at $1.2 million. The ultimate fate of mural remains undetermined but was taken town and preserved by the Nebraska State Historical Society Foundation in October 2022, with the intent to re-install it at an undetermined location.

External links
Pershing Center (offline)

References

Indoor arenas in Nebraska
Sports in Lincoln, Nebraska
Sports venues in Nebraska
Tourist attractions in Lincoln, Nebraska
Buildings and structures in Lincoln, Nebraska
1957 establishments in Nebraska
Sports venues completed in 1957
2014 disestablishments in Nebraska